I Love Mummy was a fantasy sitcom that ran for one season in 2002. It is composed of 26 episodes. The show was created by Ellis Iddon and Phil Meagher; and produced by Ellis Iddon, Phil Meagher, Mark Iddon, Ira Levy and Peter Williamson. The music was composed by Ellis Iddon, Phil Meagher and Simon Turner. Creative set designer was Jerry Heath.

The show centred on the Barns family, who moved into their dead grandmother's house. In the attic they come across a sarcophagus that opens up to reveal a 5,000-year-old demi-god, Prince Nuffratuti of Abu Simbel, who is unable to ascend to the afterlife until he has completed his scroll of tasks.

Notable actors 

The show starred Reece Thompson, who has starred in many films and TV shows such as Dreamcatcher, Stargate: Atlantis and The 4400.

The show also starred Elyes Gabel, who subsequently appeared in the UK medical drama Casualty as a young doctor called Guppy, and Mark Caven from The Comic Strip in the UK who also starred in the BBC series The Glam Metal Detectives. He also starred as the main character of the American action drama Scorpion as Walter O'Brien.

Actress Kim Poirier guest-starred in the episode "Old Lady" as Katie.

Full cast 
Reece Thompson as James Barns
Kelly Turner as Stephy Barns
Gina Sorell as Nancy Barns
Neil Crone as Ed Barns
Elyes Gabel as Nuff
Earl Pastko as Hep
Mark Caven as Set
Brooke Nevin as Brenda Hadley
Michael D'Ascenzo as Tilford

External links 

2002 Canadian television series debuts
2003 Canadian television series endings
2000s Canadian teen sitcoms
Television series about families
Television series by 9 Story Media Group